The 2002–03 season is FC Nantes's 60th season in existence and the club's 40th consecutive season in the top flight of French football. In addition to the domestic league, Nantes participated in this season's editions of the Coupe de France and the Coupe de la Ligue. The season covers the period from 1 July 2002 to 30 June 2003.

Players

First-team squad
Squad at end of season

Transfers

In

Out

Pre-season and friendlies

Competitions

Overall record

Ligue 1

League table

Results summary

Results by round

Matches

Coupe de France

Coupe de la Ligue

References

External links

FC Nantes seasons
Nantes